The Hamitic League of the World was an African American nationalist organization. Its declared aims were:

The word Hamitic derives from Ham the son of Noah in the Old Testament. The organisation was founded in 1917 by George Wells Parker. In 1918 it published his pamphlet Children of the Sun. At this time Cyril Briggs also became the editor of their journal, The Crusader which subsequently became the journal of the African Blood Brotherhood.

See also

 Civil Rights Movement in Omaha, Nebraska

1917 establishments in Nebraska
African Americans' rights organizations
African and Black nationalist organizations in North America
African-American history in Omaha, Nebraska
History of North Omaha, Nebraska
Organizations established in 1917